Jonathan Sole (born 9 February 1987) is a New Zealand former cricketer. He played five List A matches for Auckland in 2014.

See also
 List of Auckland representative cricketers

References

External links
 

1987 births
Living people
New Zealand cricketers
Auckland cricketers
Cricketers from Wellington City